Daniel Koprivcic (born 3 August 1981) is a retired footballer who played for Auckland City and Waitakere United in the New Zealand Football Championship (NZFC). He scored many goals for former clubs Waitakere United and Auckland City in not only the national league but the Oceania Champions League. He holds the record as the only player to participate in the FIFA Club World Cup six times.

Early life
Koprivcic was born in Croatia and emigrated to New Zealand with his family in his early teens in 1995.

Club career

Early career
Koprivcic played his early football for Central United in Auckland, later moving to Mangere United.

Waitakere United
He played for NZFC club Waitakere United from 2006–2009 and also appeared for the club in the 2007 FIFA Club World Cup, and the 2008 FIFA Club World Cup for Waitakere.

Auckland City
In 2009, he moved to Auckland City FC where he scored 4 goals in 13 appearances, as well as notching up 6 appearances in the 2009–10 OFC Champions League and scoring 7 goals. His most valuable time at Auckland City came when he was selected to represent the team at the 2009 FIFA Club World Cup in which Auckland City finished 5th out of 7th, the best an Oceania team had ever finished.

At the 2011 FIFA Club World Cup, he became the first player to compete at four Club World Cups. He went on to make two further tournament appearances, his last at the 2013 competition.

Koprivcic retired in 2014.

International career
In 2003 Koprivcic was called up for an Under-23 international between New Zealand U-23 and Japan U-23 in Kobe. He came on as a substitute in a 4–0 loss.

Honours

Club
With Waitakere United
 New Zealand Football Championship Premiers: 2007
 New Zealand Football Championship Champions 2007, 2008
 FIFA Club World Cup 7th: 2007, 2008
 OFC Champions League Champions: 2007, 2008

With Auckland City FC
 FIFA Club World Cup 5th: 2009

Individual
 OFC Champions League Golden Ball: 2011
 Daniel Koprivcic has the record number of participations in the FIFA Club World Cup, taking part in the six tournaments: 2007, 2008, 2009, 2011, 2012 and 2013

References

External links
 Auckland City FC profile
 
 

1981 births
Living people
Footballers from Osijek
New Zealand association footballers
Auckland City FC players
Expatriate association footballers in New Zealand
Croatian emigrants to New Zealand
Association football forwards